was a Japanese feudal domain of the Edo period Tokugawa shogunate, located in Nukata District Mikawa Province (part of modern-day Aichi Prefecture), Japan. It was centered on what is now part of the city of Okazaki, Aichi.

History
Ōoka Tadasuke, the famous magistrate who had served the 9th Tokugawa shōgun, Tokugawa Yoshimune, and who had successfully carried out the Kyōhō Reforms received an additional 4,000 koku  in revenue on his promotion to sōshaban in 1748. This put him over the 10,000 koku requirement to be styled as daimyō, and he received the newly created fief of Nishi-Ōhira as his domain. However, he never relocated to his new territory, and resided in Edo to his death in 1757.

Nishi-Ōhira Domain was not a single contiguous territory, but consisted of several widely scattered holdings: in addition to 12 villages in Nukata District, the territory consisted of 5 villages in Kamo District, 5 villages in Hoi District, 2 villages in Omi District in Mikawa, 3 villages in Ichihara District, Kazusa Province and the original 2 villages of the Ōoka clan in Kōza District, Sagami Province.

The domain was inherited by Ōoka Tadasuke's heirs after his death, but it was not until 1748, during the tenure of his grandson, Ōoka Tadatsune, that a jin'ya fortified residence was built in Nishi-Ōhira to be the nominal capital of the domain. Due to its special relationship with the Tokugawa shogunate, the Ōoka clan was one of the few clans exempted from the sankin kōtai regulations, and lived in their Edo residence full-time. The graves of all of the daimyō of Nishi-Ōhira are located at the Ōoka clan temple of Jōken-ji in Chigasaki, Kanagawa.

During the Bakumatsu period, Nishi-Ōhira remained loyal to the Tokugawa shogunate, but after the Battle of Toba–Fushimi in the Boshin War, capitulated to the new Meiji government. After the abolition of the han system in July 1871, it became “Nishi-Ōhira Prefecture”, which later became part of Aichi Prefecture.

The domain had a population of 6,945 people in 1709 households per an 1869 census. It maintained its Edo residence kamiyashiki in Sakuradamon.

List of daimyōs
  Ōoka clan (fudai) 1748–1871

References

External links
 Nishi- Ōhira on "Edo 300 HTML"

Notes

Domains of Japan
1748 establishments in Japan
States and territories established in 1748
1871 disestablishments in Japan
States and territories disestablished in 1871
Mikawa Province
Domains of Aichi Prefecture